The Jewish Channel is a cable television channel available on Comcast, iO Optimum Cablevision, Time Warner Cable, Verizon FiOS, RCN, Frontier Communications, Bright House Networks, and Cox Cable. In 2011, the channel had around 45,000 subscribers.

References

External links
 
 New York Daily News article

Religious television stations in the United States
Jewish television
Jewish mass media in the United States